No toquen a la nena (Don't touch the girl) is a 1976 Argentinian film.

Directed by Juan José Jusid, with a script by Oscar Viale and Jorge Goldemberg and starring Luis Politti, María Vaner, Norma Aleandro, Lautaro Murúa, Pepe Soriano and Julio de Grazia, among others. Among the roster of extras, the film has the participation of an unknown Cecilia Roth. When it was released in Argentina, many of its actors had had to go into exile for reasons of political persecution.

The film has a cast of great Argentinian cinema actors, including the leading role of Julio Chávez. In the technical team Adolfo Aristarain acted as assistant director, and Juan Carlos Desanzo in photography, who would later become prominent directors of Argentinian cinema.

Plot
The film tells in a manners comedy tone, the reactions of young people and adults to the pregnancy of a teenage girl.

Patricia (Patricia Calderón) is a beautiful 17-year-old teenager who has become pregnant and, in desperation, befriended a friend of her hippie brother, Willy (Julio Chávez), in whom she finds support and understanding. When her father (Luis Politti), an Argentine classic of Italian descent, found out, first she hit Willy hard, believing her to be the father, and then she sought to marry her to her daughter to "save face"

Cast
 Luis Politti	... 	Augusto
 María Vaner	... 	Haydée
 Norma Aleandro	... 	Andrea
 Lautaro Murúa	... 	Horacio
 Pepe Soriano      ...     Severino Di Filippi "El Nono"
 Julio De Grazia	... 	Bambi
 Pierina Dealessi	... 	La Mamma
 Gustavo Rey	... 	Javier
 Julio Chávez      ...     Willy
 Cecilia Roth	... 	Cecilia
 Patricia Calderón	... 	Patricia
 Alberto Busaid	... 	Nacho
 Lidia Catalano	... 	Dorita
 Claudio Lucero	... 	Capataz
 Patricio Contreras	... 	Peón
 Juan Manuel Tenuta	... 	Funes
 Aldo Marinelli	... 	El Médico
 Chunchuna Villafañe	... 	La Mercedes
 Nora Renzi	... 	Flequillo
 Oscar Viale	... 	Porta
 Atilio Polverini		
 Divina Gloria		
 Gonzalo Urtizberea

External links
 

1976 films
Argentine comedy films
1970s Spanish-language films